Plagioporus skrjabini is a species of a trematode in the family Opecoelidae.

Hosts 
Hosts of Plagioporus skrjabini include:
 Snail Theodoxus fluviatilis serves as the first intermediate host
 Sand hoppers are natural additional hosts: Pontogammarus robustoides, Pontogammarus crassus, Dikerogammarus villosus, Dikerogammarus haemobaphes, Chaetogammarus ischnus and Amathillina cristata.
 Definitive hosts are Cobitis taenia, and gobies: toad goby (Mesogobius batrachocephalus), bighead goby (Ponticola kessleri) and monkey goby (Neogobius fluviatilis).

References 

Animals described in 1951
Plagiorchiida